Anchorage is a ghost town in Buffalo County, Wisconsin, United States.

About all that remains of this town is a small cemetery on Wisconsin Highway 88.

References 

Populated places in Buffalo County, Wisconsin
Ghost towns in Wisconsin